The women's 80 metres hurdles at the 1958 European Athletics Championships was held in Stockholm, Sweden, at Stockholms Olympiastadion on 20, 21, and 22 August 1958.

Medalists

Results

Final
22 August
Wind: 0.4 m/s

Semi-finals
21 August

Semi-final 1
Wind: 0 m/s

Semi-final 2
Wind: 0.4 m/s

Heats
20 August

Heat 1
Wind: 0.7 m/s

Heat 2
Wind: 1 m/s

Heat 3
Wind: 0.4 m/s

Heat 4
Wind: 0.9 m/s

Participation
According to an unofficial count, 14 athletes from 11 countries participated in the event.

 (1)
 (1)
 (1)
 (1)
 (1)
 (1)
 (1)
 (3)
 (1)
 (2)
 (1)

References

80 metres hurdles
Sprint hurdles at the European Athletics Championships
Euro